The 2018 AFF Championship was the 12th edition of the AFF Championship, the football championship of nations affiliated to the ASEAN Football Federation (AFF), and the 6th under the name AFF Suzuki Cup. This was the first time a new format has been applied with the group stage was played in a home-and-away format instead of be hosted in two nations from 2002 to 2016. 

The final tournament ran from 8 November and ended on 15 December 2018. Through the agreement between AFF and East Asian Football Federation (EAFF), the winner of the tournament will qualify for the AFF–EAFF Champions Trophy.

Thailand were the defending champions, but lost to Malaysia in the semi-finals. Vietnam won the tournament by a 3–2 victory in the two-legged final against Malaysia to secure their second title, and subsequently qualified to meet 2017 EAFF E-1 Football Championship winner of South Korea in the 2019 AFF–EAFF Champions Trophy.

Format
In March 2016, it was reported that the AFF was mulling over changes to the tournament format due to the failure to attract big crowds for matches not involving the host nation. It was then confirmed by the AFF that starting with the 2018 edition, a new format would be applied. The nine highest ranked teams would automatically qualify with the 10th and 11th ranked teams playing in a two-legged qualifier. The 10 teams would be split in two groups of five and play a round robin system with each team playing two home and two away fixtures. A draw will be made to determine where the teams play while the format of the knockout round would remain unchanged.

Home-Away matches division:

Qualification

Nine teams were automatically qualified in the AFF Championship final tournament. Based on the 2016 AFF Championship ranking, Brunei and Timor Leste played in a home and away playoffs which was conducted on 1 and 8 September 2018 with the latter securing qualification. Australia, a member since 2013, did not enter the tournament.

Qualified teams

Draw
The draw for the tournament was held on 2 May 2018 at Hotel Mulia in Jakarta, Indonesia with the pot placements followed each teams progress in the previous two editions. At the time of the draw the identity of the national team that secured qualification was still to be determined (Timor-Leste).

Squads

Each team were allowed a preliminary squad of 50 players. A final squad of 23 players (three of whom must be goalkeepers) must be registered one day before the first match of the tournament.

Officials
The following officials were chosen for the competition.

Referees

  Chris Beath
  Amdillah Zainuddin
  Fu Ming
  Ma Ning
  Thoriq Munir Alkatiri
  Alireza Faghani
  Hiroyuki Kimura
  Adham Makhadmeh
  Ahmed Al-Ali
  Amirul Izwan Yaacob
  Nagor Amir Noor Mohamed
  Nazmi Nasaruddin
  Suhaizi Shukri
  Ahmed Al-Kaf
  Clifford Daypuyat
  Abdulrahman Al-Jassim
  Khamis Al-Marri
  Turki Al-Khudayr
  Ahmad A'qashah
  Nathan Chan
  Kim Hee-gon
  Sivakorn Pu-udom
  Aziz Asimov
  Nguyễn Hiền Triết

Assistant referees

  Ali Faisal Rosli
  Raffizal Ramli
  Pisal Kimsy
  Sopheap Chi
  Zhou Fei
  Bambang Syamsudar
  Dinan Lazuardi
  Malang Nurhadi
  Mohammadreza Mansouri
  Reza Sokhandan
  Akane Yagi
  Ahmed Al-Roalle
  Kilar Ladsavong
  Somphavanh Louanglath
  Arif Shamil
  Azman Ismail
  Zairul Khalil
  Chit Moe Aye
  Win Thiha
  Zayar Maung
  Abu Bakar Al-Amri
  Krizmark Nanola
  Relly Balila
  Saoud Al-Maqaleh
  Taleb Al-Marri
  Abdul Hannan
  Lim Kok Heng
  Manoj Kalwani
  Ronnie Koh Min Kiat
  Komsun Khumpan
  Pattarapong Kijsathit
  Phubes Lekpha
  Phulsawat Samransuk
  Rachen Srichai
  Thanet Chuchueun
  Nguyễn Trung Hậu
  Phạm Mạnh Long
  Trần Liêm Thanh
  Trương Đức Chiến

Fourth officials

  Abdul Hakim Haidi
  Chy Samdy
  Khuon Virak
  Oki Dwi Putra
  Souei Vongkham
  Xaypaseuth Phongsanit
  Fitri Maskon
  Myat Thu
  Thant Zin Oo
  Steve Supresencia
  Jansen Foo Chuan Hui
  Letchman Gopalakrishnan
  Muhammad Taqi
  Mongkolchai Pechsri
  Titichai Nuanchan
  Wiwat Jumpaoon

Venues
There are one venue for each participating countries in the tournament with each countries get two group matches played in their home stadium. This is the first time Laos and Cambodia host matches of a final tournament. Before the tournament being held, both the Football Association of Indonesia (PSSI) and Myanmar Football Federation (MFF) have requested AFF to allow their two home matches to be held in two different stadiums in different cities. The Vietnam Football Federation (VFF) also asked AFF to move their final group match against Cambodia to Hàng Đẫy Stadium as the match date is coincides with the opening ceremony of the Vietnam National Games that will be held in Mỹ Đình National Stadium by which the request was accepted through the AFF meeting in Phnom Penh, Cambodia on 13 September. East Timor will play their designated "home" match against Thailand at the Rajamangala Stadium in Bangkok, while their home tie against the Philippines will be played at the Kuala Lumpur Stadium in Malaysia due to the incomplete floodlighting of the Dili Municipal Stadium.

Group stage

Tiebreakers
Ranking in each group shall be determined as follows:
 Greater number of points obtained in all the group matches;
 Goal difference in all the group matches;
 Greater number of goals scored in all the group matches.
If two or more teams are equal on the basis on the above three criteria, the place shall be determined as follows:
 Result of the direct match between the teams concerned;
 Penalty shoot-out if only the teams are tied, and they met in the last round of the group;
 Drawing lots by the Organising Committee.

Group A

Group B

Knockout stage

Bracket

Semi-finals
First leg

Second leg

2–2 on aggregate, Malaysia won on away goals.

Vietnam won 4–2 on aggregate.

Finals

First leg

Second leg

Vietnam won 3–2 on aggregate.

2018 AFF Championship best XI
The best XI team was a squad consisting of the eleven most impressive players at the tournament.

Statistics

Winner

Awards

Goalscorers

Discipline
In the final tournament, a player was suspended for the subsequent match in the competition for either getting red card or accumulating two yellow cards in two different matches.

Player who get a card during the semifinals and final doesn't include here.

Tournament teams ranking
This table will show the ranking of teams throughout the tournament.

Marketing

New tournament visuals, including a logo, for the AFF Championship was unveiled for the 2018 edition during the official draw held on 2 May 2018. The ASEAN Football Federation cooperated with Lagardère Sports for the tournament's branding. Five attributes were identified that are "synonymous" to the tournament. Elements combined to form the logo are a beating heart, a goalpost and raised hands by a fan that is meant to signify "pride, loyalty, football, rivalry, and passion".

In addition a colour scheme was developed for the branding. The colours devised are magenta (passion and energy), cyan (fresh beginning), green (vibrancy of a football pitch) and blue (topography of the region).

Matchballs
The official ball for AFF Suzuki Cup 2018 is the Primero Mundo X Star, which is sponsored by Grand Sport Group.

Sponsorship

Media coverage

Incidents and controversies
The Vietnam Football Federation (VFF) was fined VND 220 million (US$10,000) by the ASEAN Football Federation (AFF) for failing to send any Vietnamese players to attend the press conference before the opening match against Laos on 8 November in Vientiane, with a warning that the penalty will be heavier if it happens again. Under AFF rules, any head coach and a starting player from each team must show up at the pre-match press conference one day prior to the match. During the encounter between Myanmar and Vietnam in Group A in Yangon, the Vietnamese side was dissatisfied over the controversial decision made by Qatari referee Khamis Al-Marri after two penalty calls were denied, and another goal was ruled offside by Thai linesman Phubes Lekpha despite video replay showing the Vietnamese player was indeed onside at that time. An argument then occurred between Burmese coach Antoine Hey and Vietnamese coach Park Hang-seo which resulted in Park not shaking hands with Hey after the match. As a result, the availability and importance of video assistant referee (VAR) like in the recent 2018 FIFA World Cup is questioned where many believed it should have been enforced in all international football matches. Prior to the group match between Malaysia and Vietnam in Hanoi, young Vietnamese football fans who waiting over a night to buy tickets are being threatened by local thugs and gangsters and forced to leave. Police scouts was then being dispatched to monitor the gangs activities.

In another situation, 20 Myanmar fans (including women) who were waiting for a bus in Kuala Lumpur to return after the end of the last Group A match between Malaysia and Myanmar when they were physically and verbally attacked by around 30 unidentified assailants. Three of the Myanmar fans were injured and had to be sent to hospital for treatment. The victims decided not to make a police report for its perceived lack of effectiveness on similar cases in the past. Nevertheless, the Secretary of Football Association of Malaysia (FAM), Stuart Michael Ramalingam, made a visit to the victims' representative to apologise, explaining that they have ensured security measures being taken inside the stadium during the game but cannot prevent any untoward incident that happened outside the stadium, thus urging every football supporter to control their behaviour with a sportsmanship spirit. Despite the apology, the Myanmar Football Federation (MFF) sent a letter to the AFF to take action against the host country since it was a repeat of similar fan violence in recent years, urging for a definite end to such violence towards any visiting fans in any future matches hosted by Malaysia, as well as for a heavy penalty to be imposed on them if such problems keep recurring. As stated in their letter, the MFF wrote:

Following the complaint, FAM were given two warning notices by the AFF with a possible fine of RM21,000 (US$5,000), with the latter warning a direct result of some Malaysian supporters throwing airbomb into the stadium track after the end of the group match against Myanmar. The Football Association of Indonesia (PSSI) was fined Rp116 million (US$8,000) by the AFF after one of their players were found to be using a shirt with sponsor logo during their training session before the group match against Timor-Leste. Under the AFF Disciplinary Code 6.11 (Colour and Shirt Number), each team may not display the sponsor's logo either inside or outside the stadium during official training, games and at press conferences. Another possible fines of Rp73 million (US$5,000) also received by the team after they forgot to put the tournament logo in their home shirt during the match against Timor-Leste. Following the team's poor performance and early elimination in Group B, PSSI chairman Edy Rahmayadi blamed Indonesian media and press as the main cause for the team failure. Coach Bima Sakti's accusation on the Philippines team using many "naturalised players" also angered many Filipino football supporters. Philippines midfielder Stephan Schröck, a Filipino-German, also expressed his anger via social media saying “call us half-bloods all day, but once we’ve met, only half of you will be left”. During the press conference of the first leg final in Malaysia, a dispute between Malaysian and Vietnamese photographer occurred when the latter overshadow Malaysian photographer sights who was standing behind to taking the photo of both teams, causing them to react angrily and saying "Don't stand up!" with another Malaysian photographer wearing a cap with black shirt began to approaching the Vietnamese photographer but was being calmed by the press conference staffs as well Malaysian coach Tan Cheng Hoe who urging everyone to remain calm during the tense situation before making his speech on the upcoming final matches. A video footage on the incident had been circulating on YouTube with another voice also being recorded as saying "Oh no! A stupid photographer!".

Many Malaysian and Vietnamese fans who could not get a single ticket were also disappointed over how ticket management was being conducted by both FAM and VFF. In Malaysia, many of the fans queued up overnight and camped outside the stadium with some becoming unconscious after being trampled by other fans in crowded areas. Similar situation also occurred in Vietnam, hundreds of Vietnam People's Army (VPA) wounded veteran gathered outside the VFF's office gate to buy priority tickets for the second final match since the VFF had announced that it would sell direct tickets to those who had difficulty to buy online tickets. This resulted in chaos when they broke the federation office main gate. Prior to the first final match between the two countries in Malaysia, many Vietnamese fans who came to the stadium were disappointed when they were not allowed to enter despite having tickets, due to what was claimed to be “over-crowding” by the stadium management. One of the fans telling that an auxiliary police officer already said to her the seating area in the second tier at the stadium (directly above the visiting fans' place) is actually allocated for their fans but it seems to be already overtaken by the host fans instead. Both sides fans also expressed their frustration over the no decision taken by Australian referee Chris Beath in two incidents in the first final game such as the scuffle between two players and another foul when the ball hitting one of the Malaysian player hand in their penalty area in the 28th minute.

Notes

References

External links
 AFF Suzuki Cup official website
 ASEAN Federation official website

 
AFF Championship tournaments
1
2018 in Burmese football
2018 in Cambodian football
2018 in East Timorese sport
AFF Championship
2018 in Laotian football
2018 in Malaysian football
2018 in Philippine football
2018 in Thai football
2018 in Singaporean football
2018 in Vietnamese football
AFF Championship
AFF Championship